Jeffrey William Datz (born November 28, 1959) is an American former Major League Baseball (MLB) catcher and coach who played for the Detroit Tigers in 1989, and who is currently a scout for the New York Yankees.

Playing career
A native of Camden, New Jersey, Datz grew up in the Mullica Hill section of Harrison Township, New Jersey and graduated from Clearview Regional High School. He attended Rowan University. In 1981, he played collegiate summer baseball with the Chatham A's of the Cape Cod Baseball League. He was selected by the Houston Astros in the 19th round of the 1982 MLB Draft. He signed as a free agent with the Detroit Tigers prior to the 1989 season, and appeared in seven games for the team that year.

Coaching career

Datz was manager of the minor league Buffalo Bisons in 1998 and 1999. He led the Bisons to the league championship crown in 1998.

He was a coach with the Cleveland Indians from 2002 until the end of the 2009 season, when general manager Mark Shapiro fired the entire coaching staff. At the 2008 Home Run Derby at Yankee Stadium, Datz pitched for Cleveland Indians center fielder Grady Sizemore.

Datz served as the bench coach for the Baltimore Orioles in 2010.

On November 4, 2010, Datz was hired to be third base coach for the Seattle Mariners starting with the 2011 season. Before a Mariners game against the Los Angeles Angels of Anaheim on April 27, 2013, Datz announced that he was diagnosed with an undisclosed form of cancer, and Tacoma Rainiers manager Daren Brown was promoted to substitute for Datz.  On July 25, 2013, Datz was named Mariners interim bench coach after Eric Wedge suffered a minor stroke. On August 23, 2013, Datz resumed his position on the team as an extra coach.

Scouting career
On November 25, 2013, it was announced that Datz will serve the Mariners as a member of the club's professional scouting staff for the  season.

He then joined the New York Yankees, where he was listed as a professional scout for the  season.

References

External links

"MLB.com Mariners Bio"

1959 births
Living people
Auburn Astros players
Baltimore Orioles coaches
Buffalo Bisons (minor league) managers
Chatham Anglers players
Columbus Astros players
Columbus Clippers players
Daytona Beach Astros players
Detroit Tigers players
Cleveland Indians coaches
Cleveland Indians scouts
Major League Baseball bench coaches
Major League Baseball first base coaches
Major League Baseball third base coaches
New York Yankees scouts
Seattle Mariners coaches
Seattle Mariners scouts
Toledo Mud Hens players
Baseball players from Camden, New Jersey

People from Harrison Township, New Jersey
Sportspeople from Camden, New Jersey
Sportspeople from Gloucester County, New Jersey
Rowan Profs baseball players